YourParkingSpace is an online marketplace and parking reservation service for drivers looking to find and pre-book parking in the United Kingdom. The website and mobile app feature over 350,000 privately owned and commercially operated parking spaces, which are available to book by the hour, day or month on a subscription basis. As of 2018, YourParkingSpace served over 50 cities across the country. The company is headquartered in Canary Wharf, London.

History

Early beginnings 
YourParkingSpace was founded by Charles Cridland in London in 2006 as a free platform connecting driveway owners with motorists searching for affordable parking. Joined by co-founder Harrison Woods in November 2013, the business was relaunched, and a limited company formed. Woods had recently sold Primal Parking, a similar online service which secured a £60,000 investment from Theo Paphitis and Peter Jones on a 2012 episode of Dragons’ Den. In 2013, the company moved to Level39, Canary Wharf, London

In May 2014, YourParkingSpace raised £250,000 in seed funding from Simon Margolis and Bill Clynes, founders of Premex Group and in June, YourParkingSpace moved into Level39, One Canada Square in Canary Wharf, London.

Following the investment, in October 2014 YourParkingSpace announced a partnership with NCP. This resulted in the integration of YourParkingSpace’s pre-book technology with NCP’s own systems, so that customers are able to access over 360 NCP car parks around the UK with a QR code, bank card or ANPR technology.

In January 2015, YourParkingSpace took its first £1 in revenue and claimed that by the end of 2016 they would be making more than £5.8 million for landlords.

In January 2015, YourParkingSpace also partnered with Parkhound, an Australian parking marketplace. Operating in separate geographic markets, the partnership focused on the sharing of knowledge, insights and technology to accelerate each company's growth.

Growth and Expansion 
In November 2016, Town Centre Securities PLC invested £1.9m in return for a 10% stake in YourParkingSpace. Over the following 3 months, the company expanded from 8 to 15 full-time employees. In December 2017, Town Centre Securities PLC took up the option to increase their stake to 15%.

In 2018, YourParkingSpace grew in size grow in size to 28 full-time employees.

In September 2018, YourParkingSpace appointed Andrew Higginson as non-executive chairman. In addition to his role as chairman of Wm Morrisons Supermarkets plc, Higginson has served as Group Finance Director of Laura Ashley Holdings plc and The Burton Group plc., and spent 15 years as the Executive Director of Tesco plc, 11 years as Finance and Strategy director and 4 years as CEO of their Retail Services Division (Tesco.com, Tesco Bank, Tesco Telecoms and DunnHumby).

In September 2020, YourParkingSpace secured a £5million investment from Pelican Capital.

References 

Parking companies
Mobile applications